The Scoobie Snack is a hamburger sold primarily at the Maggie snack bar in Glasgow, Scotland. It is a popular fast food item with students.

Composition 

The Scoobie Snack consists of a hamburger, a sliced sausage, a bacon rasher, a potato scone, a fried egg and a slice of processed cheese, all contained within a floured hamburger bun and accompanied by tomato ketchup and brown sauce. Fried onions are also offered as an optional extra. 

The Scoobie Snack, because of the sausage, cheese, bacon and egg, takes similar resemblance to a breakfast roll but is often eaten at lunchtime. It is also eaten late at night by drunken Glaswegians as a greasy drunken snack that may or may not help ease the hangover process.

The Scooby Snack's invention is accredited to The Maggie Snack Bar, a food truck located for over 50 years at the intersection  of Byres Road and Great Western Road.

Derivatives 

A derivative, the Super Scooby, was invented by The Jolly Fryer café in Bristol in 2009. It consists of four  beef patties, eight rashers of bacon, eight slices of cheese, 12 onion rings and six slices of tomato in a sesame seed bun, accompanied by salad, lettuce, barbecue sauce and mayonnaise.

The sandwich costs  and comes with chips; if both the burger and chips are consumed in one sitting, customers are given a free Diet Coke.

References 

Fast food
British cuisine
Hamburgers (food)